Ervin Henry Kleffman (b. 11 January 1892 Dorchester, Wisconsin; d. 2 April 1987 San Gabriel, California) was an American composer whose music is played by concert and marching bands throughout the world.  He is best known for his marching band compositions, Salute to Peace and China Clipper.  His primary instruments were trumpet and violin.

Selected Compositions 
 Salute to Peace
 China Clipper
 My Buddy (polka, for 3 cornets, or solo cornet or 2 cornets) with band; accompaniment arranged for piano Rubank, Inc., Chicago (publisher) (1933)   
 Legionnaires on Parade (march) 
 Pride of the Pacific (march)  
 Rubato Caprice (for 3 coronets), Rubank, Inc., Chicago (publisher) (©1938)
 The Spartans (march) 
 Jantzen Beach March
 Minstrel Parade March 
 Hank and Lank (drum and trombone feature) Rubank, Inc., Chicago (publisher) (©1933) 
 America the Glorious (march for band), dedicated to Hale Ascher VanderCook (1864–1949), C. Fischer (©1954)  
 Pride of the Nation (commissioned for the Notre Dame University Band
 Onward and Upward
 Mounties on Parade
 East Meets West
 Blaze of Glory

Professional career 
He taught at the American Conservatory of Music and the Chicago Musical College.

Education 
 Bachelor and Master of Music — VanderCook College of Music, Chicago
 1940 — PhD from the now defunct Emerson University in Los Angeles

Text publications 
 Ervin H. Kleffman, How to Compose, Harmonize and Arrange a March for Full Band (1952)
 Ervin H. Kleffman, Course of Lessons in Musical Expression and Interpretation (1917) 	
 Ervin H. Kleffman, Series of treaties on band, orchestra and instrumental teaching (1920)

References 

1890s births
1987 deaths
American male composers
American composers
People from Dorchester, Wisconsin
Illinois Institute of Technology alumni
Musicians from California
Musicians from Chicago
Musicians from Wisconsin
20th-century American male musicians